Mailza Assis da Silva (born 10 December 1976) better known as Mailza Gomes is a Brazilian politician. Although born in Mato Grosso do Sul she has spent her political career representing Acre, having served as state senator since 2019.

Personal life
Gomes is married to James Gomes, the former mayor of Senador Guiomard. She is an alumnus of the Federal University of Acre. She has two children.

Political career
Gomes was not elected in the 2018 Brazilian general election, but as current senator Gladson Cameli was elected governor of Acre, she was chosen as his replacement in the senate. She is only the fourth women to serve in the federal senate from Acre, the others being Íris Célia Cabanellas, Laélia de Alcântara, and Marina Silva.

References

1976 births
Living people
People from Mato Grosso do Sul
Brazilian women in politics
Progressistas politicians
Members of the Federal Senate (Brazil)

Federal University of Acre alumni